Raud the Strong was a Norse blót priest and seafaring warrior, who resisted conversion to Christianity in the late 10th century AD.

Olaf Tryggvason was King of Norway from 995 to 1000 AD.  He played an important part in the conversion of the Vikings to Christianity.  Olaf traveled to the parts of Norway that had been under the rule of the King of Denmark.  He demanded that the citizenry be baptized, and most reluctantly agreed. Those that did not were tortured or killed.  Despite King Olaf's persuasive efforts, many of the Vikings were reluctant to renounce their Gods and adopt Christianity. New and increasingly painful tortures and executions were devised by Olaf and his men.  One of the most famous incidents of recalcitrance to Olaf's attempts at coerced conversion to Christianity is that of Raud the Strong.

Raud the Strong was a large landowner, a leader-priest of blót ("blood sacrifice" in Norse paganism), and a sea-farer. Raud was known for his beautiful longship, a boat larger than any of Olaf's, with a dragon's head carved into the bow.  The ship was called “The Dragon” or “The Serpent.”
Raud the Strong, who also had the reputation of being a wizard, was defeated by Olaf in a sea battle.  He escaped on his vessel, using the technique of sailing against the wind, which was a sailing technique unusual in northern European waters at that time.  Raud outran Olaf and escaped to his settlement in Gylling and Haering, a part of the Godey Isles.

After the weather calmed, Olaf sailed under cover of darkness to Godey and seized Raud from his bed.  Then the king told Raud that if he accepted Christian baptism, he could keep his lands and ship and the king would be his friend.

But Raud refused, saying he would never believe in Christ, and mocked Olaf's religion and deity. Olaf became incensed and said Raud should die a horrible death.  The king ordered him to be bound to a beam of wood, with his face pointed upward, and a round pin of wood put between his teeth to force his mouth open. The king then ordered a snake to be put into Raud's mouth, but the snake would not go in.  Olaf then ordered a drinking horn to be put into Raud's mouth, and forced the serpent to go in by holding a red-hot iron at the opening of the horn.  As a result, the snake crept into Raud's mouth and down his throat, and gnawed its way out his side and Raud died.

Olaf seized Raud's gold and silver, weapons and many valuable artifacts.  All the men who were with Raud were baptized, or, if they refused, were killed or tortured. The king also took the dragonship that Raud had owned, and steered it himself since it was a much larger than any ship that he had.

According to legend this is how the famous Viking ships got their distinctive shape.

Henry Wadsworth Longfellow dealt with the story of King Olaf and Raud the Strong in his Tales of a Wayside Inn (1863), Part First, The Musician's Tale; The Saga of King Olaf X. Raud the Strong.

See also
Norse paganism

References
 Boyesen, Hjalmar Hjorth (author) and Keary, Charles Francis (contributor), A History of Norway: from the Earliest Times.  Whitefish, MT:  Kessinger Publishing, LLC, 1900, (reprinted) 2007.  ; .
Du Chaillu, Paul Belloni, The Viking Age.  London: John Murray, 1889 (reprinted 2001).
Snorri Sturluson, Heimskringla (The Chronicle of the Kings of Norway) (c. 1230), English translation by Samuel Laing.  London, 1844.

10th-century clergy
Year of death unknown
Viking warriors
Viking Age clergy
Year of birth unknown
10th-century Norwegian people
10th-century executions
People from Bodø
Pagan martyrs
10th-century Vikings